Mursal Hedayat MBE was awarded the Barclays Woman in the Community Award 2021.

She is the founder and CEO of tech social enterprise start-up Chatterbox, an online language school that trains and employs refugees as teachers, enabling people to take advantage of the language skills of asylum seekers The refugee teachers have higher education and were often qualified professionals in their countries of origin. Chatterbox works with corporate clients and has gained support from British and Silicon Valley investors. In 2018, Chatterbox won a ‘Next Billion’ Edtech Prize for high impact innovative technology.

She lives in the UK having taken refuge from Afghanistan. She studied at University of Leeds

Mursal is a Forbes “30 under 30” and was awarded an MBE in 2021 for services to Social Enterprise, Technology and the Economy.

References 

Year of birth missing (living people)
Living people
Women chief executives
People associated with the University of Leeds